Lullaby and the Ceaseless Roar (stylized as lullaby and… The Ceaseless Roar) is the tenth solo album by English rock singer Robert Plant. It was released on 8 September 2014 on Nonesuch/Warner Bros. Records. It was also Plant's first studio album with his backing band the Sensational Space Shifters, although the band is not credited on the front cover.

Critical reception

Lullaby and the Ceaseless Roar received acclaim by the majority of music critics. At Metacritic, which assigns a normalised rating out of 100 to reviews from a selection of critics, the album received an average score of 81, based on 23 reviews. The album was named one of the 50 best albums of 2014 by NPR Music.

Track listing

 – derived from the Lead Belly song "Po' Howard" (Huddie Ledbetter, John A. Lomax, Alan Lomax); also incorporates lyrics and melody from "Wah Wah", from the album No Quarter: Jimmy Page and Robert Plant Unledded.

Sources:

Personnel
Musicians
Robert Plant – vocals, production
The Sensational Space Shifters (as backing band): 
Justin Adams – bendirs, djembe, guitars, tehardant, background vocals
Liam "Skin" Tyson – banjo, guitar, background vocals.
John Baggott – keyboards, loops, moog bass, piano, tabla, background vocals
Juldeh Camara – kologo, ritti, Fulani vocals
Billy Fuller – bass, drum programming, omnichord, upright bass
Dave Smith – drum set
Julie Murphy – vocals on "Embrace Another Fall"
Nicola Powell – background vocals on "Poor Howard"

Production
Tim Oliver – recording, mixing
Tim Holmes – recording
Tchad Blake – mixing
Bob Ludwig – mastering
Brett Kilroe and Geoffrey Hanson – art direction

Source:

Charts

Weekly charts

Year-end charts

References

External links

2014 albums
Robert Plant albums
Nonesuch Records albums
Warner Records albums